The 1st constituency of Charente is a French legislative constituency in the Charente département.

Deputies

Election results

2023 by-election

2022

2017

2012

2007

|- style="background-color:#E9E9E9;text-align:center;"
! colspan="2" rowspan="2" style="text-align:left;" | Candidate
! rowspan="2" colspan="2" style="text-align:left;" | Party
! colspan="2" | 1st round
! colspan="2" | 2nd round
|- style="background-color:#E9E9E9;text-align:center;"
! width="75" | Votes
! width="30" | %
! width="75" | Votes
! width="30" | %
|-
| style="background-color:" |
| style="text-align:left;" | Jean-Claude Viollet
| style="text-align:left;" | Socialist Party
| PS
| 
| 40.93%
| 
| 58.74%
|-
| style="background-color:" |
| style="text-align:left;" | Martine Faury
| style="text-align:left;" | Union for a Popular Movement
| UMP
| 
| 34.89%
| 
| 41.26%
|-
| style="background-color:" |
| style="text-align:left;" | Samuel Cazenave
| style="text-align:left;" | Democratic Movement
| MoDem
| 
| 8.38%
| colspan="2" style="text-align:left;" |
|-
| style="background-color:" |
| style="text-align:left;" | Jean-Yves Le Turdu
| style="text-align:left;" | The Greens
| VEC
| 
| 3.00%
| colspan="2" style="text-align:left;" |
|-
| style="background-color:" |
| style="text-align:left;" | Yseult Goutierre
| style="text-align:left;" | Front National
| FN
| 
| 2.67%
| colspan="2" style="text-align:left;" |
|-
| style="background-color:" |
| style="text-align:left;" | Jean-Pierre Bellefaye
| style="text-align:left;" | Far Left
| EXG
| 
| 2.45%
| colspan="2" style="text-align:left;" |
|-
| style="background-color:" |
| style="text-align:left;" | Fanny Luteau
| style="text-align:left;" | Communist
| PCF
| 
| 1.88%
| colspan="2" style="text-align:left;" |
|-
| style="background-color:" |
| style="text-align:left;" | Danièle Duclaud
| style="text-align:left;" | Movement for France
| MPF
| 
| 1.54%
| colspan="2" style="text-align:left;" |
|-
| style="background-color:" |
| style="text-align:left;" | Yann Andrieux
| style="text-align:left;" | Hunting, Fishing, Nature, Traditions
| CPNT
| 
| 1.33%
| colspan="2" style="text-align:left;" |
|-
| style="background-color:" |
| style="text-align:left;" | Jean-Pierre Courtois
| style="text-align:left;" | Far Left
| EXG
| 
| 0.85%
| colspan="2" style="text-align:left;" |
|-
| style="background-color:" |
| style="text-align:left;" | Valérie Paour
| style="text-align:left;" | Ecologist
| ECO
| 
| 0.75%
| colspan="2" style="text-align:left;" |
|-
| style="background-color:" |
| style="text-align:left;" | Alain Chailloux
| style="text-align:left;" | Miscellaneous Right
| DVD
| 
| 0.68%
| colspan="2" style="text-align:left;" |
|-
| style="background-color:" |
| style="text-align:left;" | Josette Blanc
| style="text-align:left;" | Independent
| DIV
| 
| 0.65%
| colspan="2" style="text-align:left;" |
|-
| colspan="8" style="background-color:#E9E9E9;"|
|- style="font-weight:bold"
| colspan="4" style="text-align:left;" | Total
| 
| 100%
| 
| 100%
|-
| colspan="8" style="background-color:#E9E9E9;"|
|-
| colspan="4" style="text-align:left;" | Registered voters
| 
| style="background-color:#E9E9E9;"|
| 
| style="background-color:#E9E9E9;"|
|-
| colspan="4" style="text-align:left;" | Blank/Void ballots
| 
| 2.29%
| 
| 2.41%
|-
| colspan="4" style="text-align:left;" | Turnout
| 
| 61.28%
| 
| 62.12%
|-
| colspan="4" style="text-align:left;" | Abstentions
| 
| 38.72%
| 
| 37.88%
|-
| colspan="8" style="background-color:#E9E9E9;"|
|- style="font-weight:bold"
| colspan="6" style="text-align:left;" | Result
| colspan="2" style="background-color:" | PS HOLD
|}

2002

 
 
 
 
 
 
 
 
|-
| colspan="8" bgcolor="#E9E9E9"|
|-

1997

 
 
 
 
 
 
 
 
 
|-
| colspan="8" bgcolor="#E9E9E9"|
|-

References

Sources
 French Interior Ministry results website: 

1